Too Cool to Care is the second and final studio album by rap duo New Boyz. It was released on May 17, 2011, via Shotty Music, Asylum and Warner Bros. It reached number forty-one on the Billboard 200 chart, number nine on the R&B/Hip-Hop Albums chart, and number seven on the Rap Albums chart.

Promotion
The album was available for pre-ordering on the New Boyz's website. The pre-order included the original CD, an MP3 download of the promotional single "Crush On You" featuring rapper YG, and produced by Meech Wells, and pair of randomly picked colored sunglasses, which are either green, orange, blue, purple, yellow, or red. There is also a music video for the song "Tough Kids", featuring Sabi, and produced by DJ Khalil.

As of January 1, 2012 the album has sold 50,065 copies in the US.

Singles
"Break My Bank, which features Iyaz, was released as the lead single in North America on July 13, 2010. The song peaked at number sixty-eight on the US Billboard Hot 100, and at number ten on the US Rap Songs chart. Due to it only achieving moderate success, it is only included on deluxe editions of the album. "Backseat", which features The Cataracs, and Dev, was released as the second single in North America, and as the lead single in international markets on February 15, 2011. It peaked at number twenty-six on the US Hot 100, number twelve on US Rap charts, and number seventeen on the US Pop Songs chart. The song also reached the top forty in New Zealand, in addition to charting in Australia, Canada, and the United Kingdom. "Better With the Lights Off", which features Chris Brown, was originally released as the second promotional single on May 3, 2011. It has been released as the third official single on August 2, 2011. The song debuted at number sixty-one on the US Hot 100, and has peaked at number thirty-eight. "Better With the Lights Off" has also peaked at number thirteen on the Rap Songs chart.

Track listing

Chart performance

Release history

References

2011 albums
New Boyz albums
Albums produced by DJ Khalil
Albums produced by Kane Beatz
Albums produced by J. R. Rotem
Albums produced by Detail (record producer)
Albums produced by the Cataracs
Albums produced by Maejor